The Buckeye Savings Invitational was a golf tournament on the LPGA Tour from 1965 to 1970. It was played in Cincinnati, Ohio at the Clovernook Country Club from 1965 to 1968 and at the Royal Oak Racquet & Country Club from 1969 to 1970.

Winners
Cincinnati Open
1970 Betsy Rawls

Buckeye Savings Invitational
1969 Sandra Spuzich
1968 Carol Mann
1967 Carol Mann
1966 Sandra Haynie
1965 Kathy Whitworth

References

Former LPGA Tour events
Golf in Ohio
Sports competitions in Cincinnati
Recurring sporting events established in 1965
Recurring sporting events disestablished in 1970
1965 establishments in Ohio
1970 disestablishments in Ohio
History of women in Ohio